Outwood Academy Ripon is a small mixed secondary school with academy status situated in the city of Ripon, in North Yorkshire, England.
It provides for children ages 11 to 18, and had an enrolment of 656 pupils in 2018.

The school is operated by Outwood Grange Academies Trust and the current principal is William Pratt.

It is one of over 11 secondary schools in the local area, including nearby selective Ripon Grammar School, and the more distant Thirsk School and Sixth Form College and Boroughbridge High School.

History
The school originally opened as a secondary modern in the 1930s. It was known as Ripon City School from the mid-1990s until 1999, when it became Ripon College,  a community school.

In 2000, teacher James Kelly was a regional winner in the "Most Outstanding New Teacher" category of the Teaching Awards.

In September 2011 Ripon College converted to academy status. It reopened as Outwood Academy Ripon, and became part of Outwood Grange Academies Trust.

On 11 November 2015, approximately 40 pupils at the school simultaneously fell ill during an Armistice Day service. Police said students showed signs of "sickness and feeling faint sometime between 11:00 and 11.30".

Pastoral care
Each pupil belongs to one of 21 tutor groups, known as vertical mentor groups (VMGs), which assemble after second lesson and take part in different activities. The mentor groups contain pupils from years 7-11 with the exception of Algeria which is purely Sixth Form.

Special educational needs provision
A specialist team of teaching assistants and special educational needs (SEN) managers work together in 'The Hub' to ensure that students in need of extra support are getting it. Teachers from the Hub will mentor students either on site in the Hub or in the students lessons alongside the main class teacher.

The Bridge operate a 'Bridge Pass' scheme where students in lessons feel like they need a time out or extra support can complete the rest in the Bridge.

References

External links
 
 BBC NEWS | Education | League Tables | Ripon College

Ripon
Academies in North Yorkshire
Educational institutions established in 2011
2011 establishments in England
Secondary schools in North Yorkshire
Ripon